When a Man Rides Alone may refer to:

When a Man Rides Alone (1919 film), American silent western
When a Man Rides Alone (1933 film), American western starring Tom Tyler